Queens' College is a constituent college of the University of Cambridge. Queens' is one of the oldest colleges of the university, founded in 1448 by Margaret of Anjou. The college spans the River Cam with the Mathematical Bridge connecting the two sides.

College alumni include Desiderius Erasmus, who studied at the college during his trips to England between 1506 and 1515. Other notable alumni include author T. H. White, Israeli politician Abba Eban, founding father of Ghana William Ofori Atta, newsreader and journalist Emily Maitlis, actor Stephen Fry, Governor of the Bank of England Andrew Bailey, and the British members of Parliament Stephen Kinnock and Liz Kendall.

, the college held non-current assets valued at £111.18 million.

The president of the college is the economist Mohamed A. El-Erian. Past presidents include John Fisher.

History 

Queens' College was founded in 1448 by Margaret of Anjou and refounded in 1465 by the rival queen Elizabeth Woodville. This dual foundation is reflected in its orthography: Queens', not Queen's, although the full name is "The Queen's College of St Margaret and St Bernard, commonly called Queens' College, in the University of Cambridge".

In 1446 Andrew Dokett obtained a charter from Henry VI to found St Bernard's College, on a site now part of St Catharine's College. A year later the charter was revoked and Dokett obtained a new charter from the king to found St Bernard's College on the present site of Old Court and Cloister Court. In 1448 Queen Margaret received from her husband, King Henry VI, the lands of St Bernard's College to build a new college to be called "Queen's College of St Margaret and St Bernard". On 15 April 1448, Sir John Wenlock, chamberlain to Queen Margaret, laid the foundation stone at the south-east corner of the chapel.

By 1460 the library, chapel, gatehouse and President's Lodge were completed and the chapel licensed for service. In 1477 and 1484 Richard III made large endowments to the college and his wife, Anne Neville, became the third queen to be patroness of the college, making endowments on her own behalf, which were all taken away by Henry VII after he overthrew Richard. Between that time and the early 1600s, many improvements were made and new buildings constructed, including the Walnut Tree Building, which was completed in 1618. Since then the college has refurbished most of its old buildings and steadily expanded.

In the early 17th century Queens' had become a very fashionable college for the gentry and aristocracy, especially for those with more Puritan leanings. 

During the English civil war the college sent all its silver to help the King. As a result, the president and the fellows were ejected from their posts. In 1660 the president was restored.

In 1777, a fire in the Walnut Tree Building destroyed the upper floors, which were rebuilt 1778–82. In February 1795 the college was badly flooded, reportedly waist-deep in the cloisters.

In 1823, the spelling of the college's name officially changed from Queen's to Queens'. The earliest known record of the Queens' College Boat Club dates from 1831. In 1862, the St Bernard Society, the debating club of the college was founded. In 1884, the first football match was played by the college team and the St Margaret Society, the music society, was founded.

In 1980, the college for the first time allowed females to matriculate as members, with the first female members of the college graduating in 1983.

Coat of arms
 
The arms are the paternal arms of the first foundress queen, Margaret of Anjou, daughter of Rene, Duke of Anjou, with a difference of a bordure verte for the college. The six-quarters of these arms represent the six lordships (either actual or titular) which he claimed. These arms are of interest because the third quarter (Jerusalem) uses or (gold) on argent (silver), a combination which breaks the rule of tincture of "no metal on metal" in heraldry. The cross potent is a visual pun on the letters H and I, the first two letters of Hierusalem.

Badge 

The silver boar's head is not the official arms of the college, but, rather, a badge; a white boar was the badge of Richard III. The earliest evidence of the college using a boar's head as a symbol is from 1544. The gold cross stands for St Margaret, and the gold crozier for St Bernard, the two patron saints of Queens' College. There is also a suggestion that the saltire arrangement of these (like the St Andrew's Cross) is an allusion to Andrew Dokett, the first president of Queens'. Today, this badge is widely used by college clubs, and also appears in connection with food or dining.

Buildings and location 

Queens' College has some of the most recognisable buildings in Cambridge. It combines medieval architecture and modern architecture in extensive gardens. It is one of two Cambridge colleges whose core buildings straddle the River Cam (the other being St John's). The two halves are joined across the river by the Mathematical Bridge. The two banks are colloquially referred to as the "light side" and the "dark side". Queens' College is located to the south of the centre of the city. It is the second southernmost of the colleges on the banks of the River Cam, primarily on the east bank. (The others—in distance order—are King's, Clare, Trinity Hall, Trinity, St John's, and Magdalene to the north and Darwin to the south).

Cloister Court 

The President's Lodge of Queens' is the oldest building on the river at Cambridge (ca. 1460). The President's Lodge is part of Cloister Court: the Cloister walks were erected in the 1490s to connect the Old Court of 1448/9 with the riverside buildings of the 1460s, thus forming the court now known as Cloister Court. Essex Building, in the corner of the court, was erected 1756–60, named after its builder, James Essex the Younger (1722–1784), a local craftsman who had earlier erected the Mathematical Bridge.

Old Court 

Old Court was built between 1448 and 1451. Stylistic features suggest that this was designed by and built under the direction of the master mason Reginald Ely, who was also at the same time erecting the original Old Court of King's College (now part of the University Old Schools opposite Clare College), and the start of King's College Chapel. Whereas King's was built using very expensive stone, Queens' Old Court was made using cheaper clunch with a red brick skin. Queens' was finished within two years, whereas King's Old Court was never finished, and the chapel took nearly a century to build.

The War Memorial Library is the present student library. The War Memorial Library was formerly the original chapel, part of Old Court. It was named in honour of Queens' College alumni and members who died in service in the Second World War. Before the 1940s, the student library was the present Old Library.

The Old Library was built in 1448, part of Old Court, and situated between the President's Lodge and the original chapel. It is one of the earliest purpose-built libraries in Cambridge. It houses a collection of nearly 20,000 manuscripts and printed books. It is especially notable because nearly all printed books remain in their original bindings, because Queens' has never been wealthy enough to afford re-binding all the books in a uniform manner, as was the fashion in the 18th century. It is also notable because it contains the earliest English celestial globes, owned once by Queens' fellow of mathematics Sir Thomas Smith (1513–1577), and because its medieval lecterns were refashioned into bookshelves, still present today.

Walnut Tree Court

Walnut Tree Court was erected 1616–18. Walnut Tree Building on the east side of the court dates from around 1617 and was the work of the architects Gilbert Wragge and Henry Mason at a cost of £886.9s. Only the ground floor of the original construction remains after a fire in 1777, so it was rebuilt from the first floor upwards between 1778–1782, and battlements were added to it in 1823. This court was formerly the site of a Carmelite friary, Cambridge Whitefriars, founded in 1292, but is now the location of the college chapel and various fellows' and students’ rooms. The walnut tree in the court stands on the line of a former wall of the friary, and was a replacement of an older one in the same position after which the court was named.

The college chapel in Walnut Tree Court was designed by George Frederick Bodley, built by Rattee and Kett and consecrated in 1891. It follows the traditional college chapel form of an aisle-less nave with rows of pews on either side, following the plan of monasteries, reflecting the origins of many colleges as a place for training priests for the ministry. The triptych of paintings on the altarpiece panel are late-15th-century Netherlandish, and are attributed to the 'Master of the View of Saint Gudula'. They depict, from left to right, the Agony in the Garden of Gethsemane, the Resurrection of Jesus and Christ's Appearance to the Disciples and may originally have been part of a set of five paintings.

Friar's Court

The College experienced a growth in student numbers during the 19th century, bringing with it the need for additional student accommodation. The President's second garden was taken as the site for new student accommodation called Friars' Building, designed by W. M. Fawcett and built in 1886. The building, named after the Cambridge Whitefriars, accommodates 52 students and fellows.

Friars' Building is flanked to the East by the Dokett Building. Dokett Building was designed by Cecil Greenwood Hare and built in 1912 from thin red Daneshill brick with Corsham stone dressings and mullioned windows. It stands on the former site of almshouses which were maintained by benefaction from a former President of the college Andrew Dokett. The almshouses were demolished in 1911 to make way for the new building. On demolition of the almshouses, a fund was made available for payment of pensions – always to eight women — in accordance with the will of Dokett. In 2014, Dokett Building underwent major restorations, with the majority of the bricks in the building being replaced and the rooms being reconfigured. In 2019, railings were restored to the Queens' Lane elevation of Dokett Building. These railings were based on the original design of the railings outside Dokett Building in 1912, but at a lowered height to preserve sightlines from groundfloor windows. This building is largely occupied by second and third years, along with some fellows.

The Erasmus Building completes Friar's Court on the West. It was designed by Sir Basil Spence and erected in 1959, and is notable for being the first college building on the Backs to be designed in the Modernist tradition. The modern design of the building generated some controversy and the project encountered strong resistance at the time. It was officially opened by H.M. The Queen Mother in June 1961. The lawn in front includes a crown bowling green laid out in the 16th century.

Cripps Court 
Cripps Court, incorporating Lyon Court (named after the late Queen Mother), was designed by Sir Philip Powell of Powell & Moya and built in stages between 1972 and 1988. In brutalist style it houses a bar and gymnasium with squash courts, 171 student bedrooms, three fellows' flats, a solarium, dining hall and kitchens, various function rooms, a large multipurpose auditorium (The Fitzpatrick Hall) and three combination rooms (Junior for undergraduate students, Middle for postgraduates, and Senior for fellows). It was the benefaction of the Cripps Foundation and the largest building erected by the college.  A fourth floor was added in 2007, providing student accommodation and fellows' offices.

Fisher Building 
Named after St John Fisher, this was erected in 1936 and designed by G. C. Drinkwater. It continued the Queens' tradition of red brick. The window frames are of teak, and all internal woodwork is oak. It was the first student accommodation in Queens' to lie west of the river and was the first building in Queens' to have bathrooms and toilets on the staircase landings close to the student rooms. These were so obvious that it prompted the comment that the building "seemed to have been designed by a sanitary engineer".

The Mathematical Bridge 

The Mathematical Bridge (officially named the Wooden Bridge) crosses the River Cam and connects the older half of the college (affectionately referred to by students as the "dark side") with the newer western half (the "light side", officially known as "The Island"). It is part of one of the most photographed views in Cambridge; the typical photo being taken from the nearby Silver Street Bridge.

Popular fable is that the bridge was designed and built by Sir Isaac Newton without the use of nuts or bolts, and at some point in the past students or fellows attempted to take the bridge apart and put it back together. The myth continues that the over-ambitious engineers were unable to match Newton's feat of engineering, and had to resort to fastening the bridge by nuts and bolts.  This is why nuts and bolts can be seen in the bridge today. This story is false: the bridge was built of oak in 1749 by James Essex the Younger (1722–1784) to the design of the master carpenter William Etheridge (1709–1776), 22 years after Newton died.

It was later repaired in 1866 due to decay and had to be completely rebuilt in 1905. The rebuild was to the same design except made from teak, and the stepped walkway was made sloped for increased wheelchair access. A handrail was added on one side to facilitate the Queen Mother crossing the bridge on her visits to the college. The boltheads are more visible in the post-1905 bridge which may have given rise to this failed reassembly myth.

Gallery

Academic profile 
Queens' College accepts students from all academic disciplines. As in other Cambridge colleges, all candidates go through an interview process. Undergraduate applicants of some courses are required to take an admission test in advance. For example, from 2022 applicants in economics are expected to have taken the Test of Mathematics for University Admission before they can be admitted.

As in all other Cambridge colleges, undergraduate education is based on the tutorial system. Most undergraduate supervisions are carried out in the college, though for some specialist subjects undergraduates may be sent to tutors in other colleges. The faculty and academic supervisors associated with the colleges play a very important part in the academic success of students. The college maintains strong ties with Cambridge Judge Business School and has a growing graduate community, including a lively mix of doctoral, medical and PGCE students. The College also maintains an extensive library, which supplements the university libraries.

In 2016 Queens' ranked sixth in the Tompkins Table, which ranks the 29 undergraduate Cambridge colleges according to the academic performance of their undergraduates. Its highest position was second and its average position has been fifth. In 2015, 28.8% of Queens' undergraduates achieved Firsts. Whereas, in 2019, the Firsts achievement raised to 32.58%.

Student life 
The buildings of Queens' College include the chapel, the hall, two libraries, a bar, and common rooms for fellows, graduates and undergraduates. There are also extensive gardens, lawns, a sportsground and boat house. The college also owns its own punts which may be borrowed by students, fellows and staff.

College accommodation is provided for all undergraduate and many graduate students, with the majority of undergraduate accommodation being on the main college site, and all other students usually live in the college residence, Owlstone Croft, located in Newnham village, a fifteen-minute walk from the central site. The college also owns several houses and flats in Cambridge, which are usually occupied by doctoral students and married couples. Members of the college can choose to dine either in the hall, where three-course meals are served and members must wear academic gowns, or in the buttery, where food can be purchased from a cafeteria-style buffet.

Despite being an ancient college, Queens' is known for being among the more open and relaxed Cambridge colleges. The college provides facilities to support most sports and arts. Queens' has active student societies, known as the Junior Combination Room and the Middle Combination Room, which represent the students and organise various activities for undergraduate and graduate students respectively. There are a variety of clubs ranging from wine tasting and amateur dramatics to the Queens' College Boat Club.

Queens' has a strong reputation for music and drama, with the Fitzpatrick Hall providing theatre and concert space for students and societies from across the university.

Sports 
The college has a rich sporting history, enjoying much success in most of the major sports on offer in Cambridge. It has sports grounds, a boat-house, squash courts and gym.

The college rowing club, Queens' College Boat Club, is one of the oldest in the university with the earliest known record of the college boat club dates from 1831.  The club's boathouse was built in 1986 and is shared with Magdalene College Boat Club. Like other Cambridge boat clubs it takes part in a number of annual rowing races on the River Cam, Lent Bumps and May Bumps. Each year QCBC also hosts the Queens' Ergs competition in the Michaelmas Term, an 8x500m indoor rowing relay race open to novices only.

Queens' College Rugby Football Club (QCRFC), plays Rugby Union against other Cambridge colleges in both league and knock-out competitions.  The rugby club has produced several notable alumni including Irish international star Mike Gibson, former England captain John Spencer, Barry Holmes, Charles Nicholl and Jamie Roberts.

The college football club, QCAFC, part of the Cambridge University Association Football League (CUAFL), won the Cuppers knockout cup competition in 2010–11 and the CUAFL Premier League title in 2015–16.

Queens' is also traditionally strong in cricket, with QCCC playing their home games on the cricket ground in the Barton Road playing fields.

May Ball 

The college hosts a large, lavish May Ball every two years. In recent years, due to popularity, tickets have been available only to Queens' members and their guests. Highlights include an extravagant fireworks display and a variety of musical acts; Florence and the Machine, Bombay Bicycle Club, Kaiser Chiefs, Alex Clare, JP Cooper, and Klaxons have played at the event. 2013 marked the centenary of Queens' May Ball, the event was white tie and the entertainment included Simon Amstell and Bastille.

Traditions

College grace
The college grace is customarily said before and after dinner in the hall. The reading of grace before dinner is usually the duty of a scholar of the college; grace after dinner is said by the President or the senior fellow dining. The grace is said shortly after the fellows enter the hall, signalled by the sounding of a gong. The Ante Prandium is read after the fellows have entered, the Post Prandium after they have finished dining. However, the last grace is almost never used. A simpler English after-dinner grace is now said:

For these and all his mercies, for the queens our foundresses and for our other benefactors, God's holy name be blessed and praised. God preserve our Queen and Church.

College rivalry
The college maintains a friendly rivalry with St Catharine's College after the construction of the main court of St Catharine's College on Cambridge's former High Street relegated one side of Queens' College into a back alley.

College stamps

Queens' was one of only three Cambridge colleges (the others being Selwyn and St John's) to issue its own stamps. From 1883 the college issued its own stamps to be sold to members of the college so that they could pre-pay the cost of a college messenger delivering their mail. This was instead of placing charges for deliveries on to members' accounts, to be paid at the end of each term.

The practice was stopped in 1886 by the General Post Office as it was decided that it was in contravention of its monopoly.

Queen Mother's standard

When the college patroness, Queen Elizabeth, the Queen Mother died, she gave the college the right to fly her personal standard in her memory on the first day of Michaelmas term each year.

Walking on the grass
Unlike at most Oxbridge colleges, not even fellows may walk on the grass.

People associated with the college

Notable former students

Presidents

Royal patronesses

The college enjoyed royal patronage in its early years. Then, after a 425-year break, Elizabeth Bowes-Lyon became the college patron to mark the 550th anniversary of the college's foundation. A portrait of the late Queen Mother by June Mendoza hangs in the Senior Combination Room and the most recent court to be built in college, Lyon Court, is named after her.

Queen Elizabeth II was a patron of the college from 2003 until her death in 2022.

In popular culture 
 

The college has made its way into literature, film and television. 
Darkness at Pemberley (1932 novel) by T. H. White features St Bernard's College, a fictionalised version of Queens' College. 
In 1984, Queens' was the subject of an eight-part BBC fly-on-the-wall documentary entitled Queens': A Cambridge College.
In the American action-thriller film The Bourne Supremacy (2004), the first of a trilogy featuring Robert Ludlum’s Jason Bourne character, there are numerous visual cues and oblique references to various Cambridge colleges, but predominantly Queens’, where the director Paul Greengrass and one of the producers were both students in the mid-1970s.
Eskimo Day (1996 TV Drama), written by Jack Rosenthal, and starring Maureen Lipman, Tom Wilkinson, and Alec Guinness, is about the relationship between parents and teenagers during an admissions interview day at Queens' College. There was also a sequel, Cold Enough for Snow (1997).
Starter for 10 (2006 film) starring James McAvoy includes the filming of a University Challenge episode between Queens' College and Bristol University.
In Kingdom (2007–2009 TV series), created by Simon Wheeler and Alan Whiting, solicitor Peter Kingdom (played by Stephen Fry) and his brother (Dominic Mafham) are both Cambridge graduates. In the fourth episode of the first series, Kingdom returns to Cambridge and meets his old tutor (Richard Wilson), when one of his clients alleges that her daughter has been rejected by his old college purely because of her working-class background. Although the college is never identified, it is Queens', where Fry himself was a student, that appears on screen.
Old Hall was used as the backdrop to the music video, Things We Lost in the Fire, by the band Bastille—backing vocals were provided by the College Choir
The College is the backdrop for the  Secret Diary of a Porter Girl  blog, created by Lucy Brazier a former deputy head porter.

See also 
 List of organ scholars

References

External links

 
Colleges of the University of Cambridge
Educational institutions established in the 15th century
1448 establishments in England
Grade I listed buildings in Cambridge
Grade I listed educational buildings